"Rendez-Vu" is a song by English electronic music duo Basement Jaxx. It was released on 2 August 1999 as the second single from their debut album, Remedy (1999). "Rendez-Vu" reached number four on the UK Singles Chart and number one on the US Dance Club Songs chart. It also reached number one on the Canadian RPM Dance 30 chart and number 21 in Iceland and Ireland.

Music video
The music video for the song was directed by American director Evan Bernard, set in a Hispanic town and depicts a love story between a man and a woman. The woman has a jealous Mexican wrestler boyfriend who smashes her new lover's hand, which is replaced by a record needle. Both men tell this incident to their respective friends and meet in the town for a showdown (where a guitarist also happens to be telling the story to a few locals up to that point). The man and the wrestler meet and settle things with a best of three in rock, paper, scissors. The man wins and is reunited with his lover as the town celebrates. In the end, it is all shown to be the dream of a sleeping dog.

Track listings

Standard CD and cassette single
 "Rendez-Vu" 
 "Miracles Keep on Playin'" 
 "All U Crazies"

UK and US 12-inch single
A1. "Rendez-Vu"
B1. "Miracles Keep on Playin'" 
B2. "All U Crazies"

Italian 12-inch single
 "Rendez-Vu" 
 "Rendez-Vu" 
 "Miracles Keep on Playin'" 
 "All U Crazies"

Charts

Weekly charts

Year-end charts

Certifications

References

1999 singles
1999 songs
Astralwerks singles
Basement Jaxx songs
Songs written by Felix Buxton
Songs written by Simon Ratcliffe (musician)
UK Independent Singles Chart number-one singles
XL Recordings singles